Machete is a 2011 Philippine television drama fantasy series broadcast by GMA Network. The series is based on a Philippine fictional character of the same name by Pablo S. Gomez. Directed by Don Michael Perez and Gina Alajar, it stars Aljur Abrenica in the title role. It premiered on January 24, 2011 on the network's Telebabad line up replacing Jillian: Namamasko Po. The series concluded on March 18, 2011 with a total of 40 episodes. It was replaced by Captain Barbell in its timeslot.

Cast and characters

Lead cast
 Aljur Abrenica as Machete / Dakila Romero

Supporting cast
 Bela Padilla as Aginaya / Rosella
 Ryza Cenon as Marla Lucero / fake Aginaya / Bugana
 Ryan Eigenmann as Karum
 Polo Ravales as Zander
 Chariz Solomon as Candy de Jesus
 Anita Linda as older Aginaya
 Zoren Legaspi as Malyari
 John Arcilla as Alfonso
 Gina Alajar as Elena
 Rio Locsin as Divina Lucero
 Nonie Buencamino as Carlos
 Karen delos Reyes as Bugana
 Rocky Gutierrez as Lucco
 Gwen Zamora as Serena Johns
 Stephanie Henares as Valerie Santillan

Guest cast
 Daniella Amable as young Rosella
 Sheena Lorenzo as young Marla
 Chef Philipps as Edward John
 Carmina Villarroel as Linda Ledesma
 Joyce Ching as Dessa Ledesma
 Paolo Contis as Homer
 Robert Villar as Val Ledesma
 Daniel Matsunaga as Baal
 Kris Bernal as Jessa Ledesma / Jessa Romero

Ratings
According to AGB Nielsen Philippines' Mega Manila People/Individual television ratings, the pilot episode of Machete earned a 12.8% rating. While the final episode scored a 13.2% rating.

References

External links
 

2011 Philippine television series debuts
2011 Philippine television series endings
Filipino-language television shows
GMA Network drama series
Live action television shows based on films
Television shows set in the Philippines